Emerald Forest and the Blackbird is the fifth studio album by Finnish melodic doom metal band Swallow the Sun. The album was released February 1, 2012, by Spinefarm Records. It was also released on limited LP on both green and white vinyl by Svart Records.

The Horror Series concludes from this album, also being on The Morning Never Came, Hope & New Moon.

On January 3, 2012, a music video for the track "Cathedral Walls" was released by the band. The song features guest vocals by former Nightwish vocalist Anette Olzon. The band made the entire album available for streaming on the Finnish metal magazine Inferno's website, from January 25 until its release a week later on February 1.

This is the last release with Kai Hahto, as he would quit to work with Nightwish two years later.

The song "April 14th" is a memorial to Peter Steele who died on that day in 2010.

Track listing

Personnel
Mikko Kotamäki - vocals 
Markus Jämsen - guitar 
Juha Raivio - guitar 
Aleksi Munter - keyboards 
Matti Honkonen - bass guitar 
Kai Hahto - drums

Guests
Aleah Stanbridge – vocals on tracks 1 and 7
Anette Olzon – vocals on track 4

References 

Swallow the Sun albums
2012 albums